Mohamed Farouk (born 6 October 1978) is a retired Egyptian footballer.

Club career
Farouk had a spell with Ankaragücü in the Turkish Süper Lig. He had a dispute with his former club Ittihad over the payment of his wages.

International career
Farouk has made 15 appearances for the senior Egypt national football team.

References

External links

1978 births
Living people
Egyptian footballers
Egypt international footballers
Egyptian expatriate footballers
Al Ahly SC players
MKE Ankaragücü footballers
Footballers from Cairo
Al Ittihad Alexandria Club players
Petrojet SC players
Süper Lig players
Expatriate footballers in Turkey
2000 African Cup of Nations players
Egyptian Premier League players
Association football forwards
Future FC (Egypt) players